Cavon Walker (born July 4, 1994) is an American football defensive end for the Vegas Vipers of the XFL. He played college football at Maryland.

High school career 
Walker was a three-star recruit coming out of high school. Walker committed to play football at Maryland.

College career 
Walker played college football at Maryland.

Professional career

Chicago Bears 
On April 28, 2018, Walker was signed by the Chicago Bears as an undrafted free agent. Walker was released during final roster cuts.

Kansas City Chiefs 
Walker was signed to a reserve/future contract with the Kansas City Chiefs following the 2018 NFL season. Walker was waived during final roster cuts.

New York Guardians 
Walker was selected by the New York Guardians in Phase 3 Round 8 of the 2020 XFL Draft. Walker led the XFL in sacks. He had his contract terminated when the league suspended operations on April 10, 2020.

Pittsburgh Steelers
Walker signed with the Pittsburgh Steelers on April 13, 2020. He was waived on September 5, 2020.

Michigan Panthers
Walker was selected with the first pick of the third round of the 2022 USFL Draft by the Michigan Panthers.

Vegas Vipers
Walker signed with the Vegas Vipers of the XFL on March 16, 2023.

References 

1994 births
Living people
Players of American football from Washington, D.C.
American football defensive ends
Maryland Terrapins football players
Chicago Bears players
Kansas City Chiefs players
New York Guardians players
Pittsburgh Steelers players
Michigan Panthers (2022) players
Vegas Vipers players